The Battle of Monmouth on June 28, 1778 saw a colonial American army under Major General George Washington fight a British army led by Lieutenant General Sir Henry Clinton. After evacuating Philadelphia, Pennsylvania on June 18, Clinton intended to march his 13,000-man army to New York City. Washington sent 6,400 troops commanded by Major General Charles Lee to attack the British column of march near Monmouth Court House, New Jersey. When Clinton counterattacked, Lee ordered his badly deployed troops to fall back immediately. Washington brought up 7,000 men to support Lee's withdrawing wing and held his ground against repeated British assaults. That evening Clinton retreated from the field and continued his march to Sandy Hook, where the British fleet waited to ferry his army to New York. Both armies' casualties were about even in the last major battle in the northern colonies. Lee was court martialed for his behavior during the battle.

British order of battle

Lieutenant General Sir Henry Clinton (est. 18,000 - 19,000)
 Staff:
 Adjutant General: Lieutenant Colonel Francis Lord Rawdon
 Deputy Adjutant General: Major Stephen Kemble, Captain George Hutchinson
 Assistant Adjutant General: Lieutenant James Cramond
 Quartermaster General: Brigadier General Sir William Erskine
 Royal Artillery Commander: Brigadier General James Pattison
 Senior Engineer Officer: Captain John Montresor (Absent)
 Aide-de-Camp: Major Duncan Drummond, Captains William Sutherland, Lord William Cathcart, William Crosbie, Alexander von Wilmowsky, Ernst von Munchhausen
 Military Secretary: Captain John Smith
 Deputy Inspector General of Provincial Forces: Captain Henry Rooke
 Deputy Muster-Master of Provincial Forces: Andrew Bell

1st Division
The 1st Division was commanded by Lieutenant General Lord Cornwallis and comprised 9,440 combat troops.

Artillery
The artillery was divided between the two divisions.

2nd Division
 
The 2nd Division was commanded by Lieutenant General Wilhelm von Knyphausen and comprised 8,229 combat troops and 1,394 noncombatants. While the 1st Division fought at Monmouth Court House, the 2nd Division proceeded with the 1,500 wagons of the baggage train towards Middletown. It endured only light harassment from American militia along the way.

American order of battle

General George Washington (est. 15,000 - 16,000)
{Curly Brackets indicate Brigade/Regimental/Battalion Strength}
 Staff:
 Quartermaster General: Major General Nathanael Greene
 Inspector General: Major General: Friedrich Wilhelm von Steuben
 Senior Artillery Officer: Brigadier General Henry Knox
 Senior Engineer Officer: Brigadier General Louis Lebègue Duportail
 Adjutant General: Colonel Alexander Scammell
 Commissary Generals: Colonels Jeremiah Wadsworth and Clement Biddle
 Judge Advocate General: Colonel John Lawrence
 Military Secretary: Lieutenant Colonel Robert H. Harrison
 Assistant Secretary: James McHenry
 Aide-de-Camp: Lieutenant Colonels John Fitzgerald, Alexander Hamilton, John Laurens and Richard Meade
 Volunteer Aides-de-Camp: Brigadier Generals Joseph Reed and John Cadwalader

Vanguard

The vanguard was commanded by Major General Charles Lee and comprised approximately 4,540 troops.
 Staff:
 Acting Adjutant General: Lieutenant Colonel John Brooks
 Aide-de-camp: Captains John Francis Mercer and Evan Edwards
 Senior Artillery Officer: Lieutenant Colonel Eleazer Oswald
 Deputy Inspector: Jean Baptiste Ternant
 Advisers: Brigadier General David Forman and Colonel Marquis François de Malmedy

* Lee reshuffled his troops before launching his attack on the British rearguard, and put Wayne in charge of a detachment comprising Grayson's combined Virginia regiments, Butler's battalion and Jackson's detachment. Lafayette took over command of Wayne's original detachment.

Other advanced forces

Main line of defenses

Forward screen

Reserve (Perrine's Hill)
Forces commanded by Lafayette shadowed the British flanking column then rested behind the main defensive line at Perrine's Hill.

Combs Hill
When the main body reached Tennent's Meeting House, some two miles (three kilometres) east of Englishtown, Washington ordered Major General Nathanael Greene to take a brigade to cover the right flank. Greene was guided to Combs Hill by Lieutenant Colonel David Rhea of the 2nd New Jersey Militia.

Reserve (Englishtown)
Washington sent four brigades under Major General Friedrich Wilhelm von Steuben back to Englishtown to form a reserve.

Notes
Footnotes

Citations

References
 

 
Martin, David G., Millman, Leonard, Smith, Eric Lee. Battle of Monmouth: The Colonies take the Offensive war game. New York, NY: Simulations Publications, Inc., 1982.

revolutionarywar101.com American Revolutionary War Units
ushistory.org Regiments at Valley Forge

American Revolutionary War orders of battle